VNA may refer to:

Medicine 
Vagal nerve activity, activity of the vagus nerve which connects the brain to the heart
Ventral anterior nucleus, a nucleus of the thalamus
 Vertebral nerve activity, activity of the vertebral nerve, a nerve near the backbone and neck in vertebrates
 Virus neutralizing antibody, antibodies that are specialized to bind to viral components such as viral glycoproteins.
Vendor Neutral Archive, an archive for medical image storage that is independent of the picture archiving and communication system (PACS) that utilizes those images

Science and technology 
 Value network analysis, a methodology for handling value networks
 Vanillylamide of n-nonanoic acid, another name for the capsaicinoid nonivamide
 Vector network analyzer, an instrument for electrical circuits analysis, measuring both amplitude and phase properties
 Very narrow aisle, a type of forklift truck
 von Neumann architecture, a design model for a stored-program digital computer, utilized by virtually all modern computers

Miscellaneous 
 Vietnam news agency, the official news agency of Vietnam
 Vietnamese National Army (1949–1955), the loyalist army in the First Indochina War
 Virgin Nigeria Airways, the former name of Nigerian Eagle Airlines, the national flag carrier of Nigeria
 Visiting Nurse Association, a type of home healthcare organization

Codes 
VNA is:
 the IATA airport designator of Saravane Airport, Salavan Province, Laos
 the ICAO airline designator of Empresa Aviación Interamericana, Uruguay

See also 
 Vnà, a village in the Lower Engadine, Graubünden, Switzerland